Little Miss Optimist is a 1917 American silent drama film directed by Robert Thornby and written by Gardner Hunting. The film stars Vivian Martin, Tom Moore, Charles West, Ernest Joy, Charles K. Gerrard, and Helen Bray. The film was released on August 26, 1917, by Paramount Pictures.

Plot
As described in a film magazine, when the foster mother of Mazie-Rosie Carden (Martin) marries, she is forced to find another home. She is sent to Hope Mission where she is given a place to stay. A millionaire named West (Joy) is murdered in his home, and Mazie's brother Ben (West) is accused of the crime. Fear of the police drives Mazie to flee to a church where she hides for several days. On Sunday, she is forced to hide in the pulpit and from here she is able to identify the killer through a much damaged coin West had on his person at the time of his murder. With the real murderer brought to justice and her brother free, Mazie is happy. She discovers that she is loved by a young man whom she befriended when he first came to the town, and like a fairy tale they live happily ever after.

Cast 
Vivian Martin as Mazie-Rosie Carden
Tom Moore as Deal Hendrie
Charles West as Ben Carden
Ernest Joy as John West
Charles K. Gerrard as Samuel Winter
Helen Bray as Belle Laurie

Reception
Like many American films of the time, Little Miss Optimist was subject to cuts by city and state film censorship boards. The Chicago Board of Censors cut two views of a stamp (the board always cut close-ups of envelopes), and scenes of the murder striking man on his head with a bronze, man striking Carden with the bronze, and two theft scenes.

References

External links 
 

1917 films
1910s English-language films
Silent American drama films
1917 drama films
Paramount Pictures films
Films directed by Robert Thornby
American black-and-white films
American silent feature films
1910s American films